The following outline is provided as an overview of and topical guide to Seychelles:

Other nearby island countries and territories include Zanzibar to the west, Mauritius and Réunion to the south, Comoros and Mayotte to the southwest, and the Suvadives of the Maldives to the northeast. Seychelles has the smallest population of any sovereign state of Africa.

General reference 

 Pronunciation: 
 Common English country name:  Seychelles
 Official English country name:  The Republic of Seychelles
 Common endonym(s): Sesel, Seychelles 
 Official endonym(s):  
 Adjectival(s): Seychellois
 Demonym(s): Seychellois (male) / Seychelloise (female)
 ISO country codes:  SC, SYC, 690
 ISO region codes:  See ISO 3166-2:SC
 Internet country code top-level domain:  .sc

Geography of Seychelles 

Geography of Seychelles
 Seychelles is: an island country of 155 islands
 Location:
 Eastern Hemisphere and Southern Hemisphere
 Africa (off its east coast, north of Madagascar)
 East Africa
 Southern Africa
 Indian Ocean
 Time zone:  Seychelles Time (UTC+04)
 Extreme points of Seychelles
 High:  Morne Seychellois on Mahé 
 Low:  Indian Ocean 0 m
 Land boundaries:  none
 Coastline:  Indian Ocean 491 km
 Population of Seychelles: 98,000  – 190th most populous country

 Area of Seychelles: 451 km2
 Atlas of Seychelles

Environment of Seychelles 

 Climate of Seychelles
 Environmental issues in Seychelles
 Renewable energy in Seychelles
 Protected areas of Seychelles
 National parks of Seychelles
 Wildlife of Seychelles
 Flora of Seychelles
 Fauna of Seychelles
 Birds of Seychelles
 Mammals of Seychelles

Natural geographic features of Seychelles 

 Glaciers in Seychelles: none
 Rivers of Seychelles
 World Heritage Sites in Seychelles

Regions of Seychelles 

Regions of Seychelles

Ecoregions of Seychelles 

List of ecoregions in Seychelles

Administrative divisions of Seychelles 

Administrative divisions of Seychelles
 Districts of Seychelles

Districts of Seychelles 

Districts of Seychelles
 Cities in Seychelles

Demography of Seychelles 

Demographics of Seychelles

Government and politics of Seychelles 

Politics of Seychelles
 Form of government:
 Capital of Seychelles: Victoria
 Elections in Seychelles
 Political parties in Seychelles

Branches of the government of Seychelles 

Government of Seychelles

Executive branch of the government of Seychelles 
 Head of state: President of Seychelles,
 Head of government: Prime Minister of Seychelles,
 Cabinet of Seychelles

Legislative branch of the government of Seychelles 

 Parliament of Seychelles (bicameral)
 Upper house: Senate of Seychelles
 Lower house: House of Commons of Seychelles

Judicial branch of the government of Seychelles 

Court system of Seychelles
 Supreme Court of Seychelles

Foreign relations of Seychelles 

Foreign relations of Seychelles
 Diplomatic missions in Seychelles
 Diplomatic missions of Seychelles

International organization membership 
The Republic of Seychelles is a member of:

African, Caribbean, and Pacific Group of States (ACP)
African Development Bank Group (AfDB)
African Union (AU)
Common Market for Eastern and Southern Africa (COMESA)
Commonwealth of Nations
Food and Agriculture Organization (FAO)
Group of 77 (G77)
Indian Ocean Commission (InOC)
International Atomic Energy Agency (IAEA)
International Bank for Reconstruction and Development (IBRD)
International Civil Aviation Organization (ICAO)
International Criminal Court (ICCt) (signatory)
International Criminal Police Organization (Interpol)
International Federation of Red Cross and Red Crescent Societies (IFRCS)
International Finance Corporation (IFC)
International Fund for Agricultural Development (IFAD)
International Labour Organization (ILO)
International Maritime Organization (IMO)
International Monetary Fund (IMF)
International Olympic Committee (IOC)
International Organization for Standardization (ISO) (correspondent)

International Red Cross and Red Crescent Movement (ICRM)
International Telecommunication Union (ITU)
International Trade Union Confederation (ITUC)
Multilateral Investment Guarantee Agency (MIGA)
Nonaligned Movement (NAM)
Organisation internationale de la Francophonie (OIF)
Organisation for the Prohibition of Chemical Weapons (OPCW)
Southern African Development Community (SADC)
United Nations (UN)
United Nations Conference on Trade and Development (UNCTAD)
United Nations Educational, Scientific, and Cultural Organization (UNESCO)
United Nations Industrial Development Organization (UNIDO)
Universal Postal Union (UPU)
World Customs Organization (WCO)
World Federation of Trade Unions (WFTU)
World Health Organization (WHO)
World Intellectual Property Organization (WIPO)
World Meteorological Organization (WMO)
World Tourism Organization (UNWTO)
World Trade Organization (WTO) (observer)

Law and order in Seychelles 

Law of Seychelles
 LGBT rights in Seychelles
 Seychelles Police Force

Military of Seychelles 

Military of Seychelles
Seychelles People's Defence Force
 Command
 Commander-in-chief:
 Forces
 Infantry Unit (Seychelles)
 Seychelles Coast Guard
 Seychelles Air Force

Local government in Seychelles 

Local government in Seychelles

History of Seychelles 

History of Seychelles
 Current events of Seychelles

Culture of Seychelles 

Culture of Seychelles
 Cuisine of Seychelles
 Languages of Seychelles
 National symbols of Seychelles
 Coat of arms of Seychelles
 Flag of Seychelles
 National anthem of Seychelles
 Public holidays in Seychelles
 Religion in Seychelles
 Hinduism in Seychelles
 Islam in Seychelles
 World Heritage Sites in Seychelles

Art in Seychelles 
 Music of Seychelles
 Seychellois musicians

Sports in Seychelles 

Sports in Seychelles
 Football in Seychelles
 Seychelles at the Commonwealth Games
 Seychelles at the Olympics
 Seychelles at the Paralympics

Economy and infrastructure of Seychelles 

Economy of Seychelles
 Economic rank, by nominal GDP (2007): 172nd (one hundred and seventy second)
 Agriculture in Seychelles
 Communications in Seychelles
 Internet in Seychelles
 Companies of Seychelles
Currency of Seychelles: Rupee
ISO 4217: SCR
 Energy in Seychelles
Renewable energy in Seychelles
 Mineral industry of Seychelles
 Mining in Seychelles
 Tourism in Seychelles
 Museums in Seychelles
 Visa policy of Seychelles
 Transport in Seychelles
 Airports in Seychelles
 Rail transport in Seychelles

Education in Seychelles 

Education in Seychelles

See also 

Seychelles
Index of Seychelles-related articles
List of international rankings
List of Seychelles-related topics
Member state of the Commonwealth of Nations
Member state of the United Nations
Outline of Africa
Outline of geography

References

External links 

 Virtual Seychelles – Primary government of Seychelles portal.

Seychelles
Seychelles